Lanka Sundaram (Telugu: లంక సుందరం) (1 January 1905 – 8 January 1967) was an Indian politician and an expert in international law.

Life
He was born in Chodavaram in Godavari district of Andhra Pradesh. He did his primary education in Noble College, Machilipatnam. During an oration, Maharajah of Baroda, Syaji Rao Gaekwad  sponsored his education in England. He studied at University of Oxford in International Law. In 1929, he qualified in the Indian Civil Service examination. But the British Government refused to give him government job. Hence he has concentrated on social service.

He was elected to the first Lok Sabha in 1952 from Visakhapatnam constituency. He was openly criticised during the parliamentary discussions on various issues to the country during the early period after Indian independence.

He was a footballer. He wrote many books and was the editor of Commerce and Industry.  His books are chosen for university syllabi and often used as reference material. India in World Politics is his main book.

Committee on Public Undertakings
Lanka Sundaram, Independent member of Indian Parliament moved a resolution and initiated the discussion on the need for setting up a Parliamentary Committee on Public Undertakings to focus on the broader policy and operational issues concerning public enterprises. The resolution was adopted in December 1953 and the committee was set up in 1964.

Publications

 A secular state for India; thoughts on Indiaʼs political future (1944)
 India Analysed, Volume I, International (1933) along with Alfred Zimmern; Manning, C.A.W.; Keith, Arthur Berriedale; Jenks, C.W.

References

External links
 Biodata of Lanka Sundaram at Lok Sabha website.

1905 births
1967 deaths
20th-century Indian lawyers
India MPs 1952–1957
Alumni of the University of Oxford
Lok Sabha members from Andhra Pradesh
People from East Godavari district
Politicians from Visakhapatnam